The Roman Catholic Diocese of Quilmes is located in the city of Quilmes, capital of Quilmes Partido, in the province of Buenos Aires in Argentina. It was established by Pope Paul VI on 19 June 1976.

Bishops

Ordinaries
 Jorge Novak, S.V.D. (1976–2001)
 Luis Teodorico Stöckler (2002–2011)
 Carlos José Tissera (2011–present)

Coadjutor bishop
Gerardo Tomás Farrell (1997-2000), did not succeed to see

Auxiliary bishop
Marcelo Julián Margni (2017-2021)

References
http://www.catholic-hierarchy.org/diocese/dquil.html

Quilmes
Quilmes
Quilmes
Quilmes
Quilmes
1976 establishments in Argentina